Klaus is a German, Dutch and Scandinavian given name and surname. It originated as a short form of Nikolaus, a German form of the Greek given name Nicholas.

Notable persons whose family name is Klaus
Billy Klaus (1928–2006), American baseball player
Chris Klaus (born 1973), American entrepreneur
Frank Klaus (1887–1948), German-American boxer, 1913 Middleweight Champion
Fred Klaus (born 1967), German footballer
Josef Klaus (1910–2001), Chancellor of Austria 1966–1970
Karl Ernst Claus (1796–1864), Russian chemist
Václav Klaus (born 1941), Czech politician, former President of the Czech Republic
Walter K. Klaus (1912–2012), American politician and farmer

Notable persons whose given name is Klaus
Brother Klaus, Swiss patron saint
Klaus Augenthaler (born 1957), German football player and manager
Klaus Badelt (born 1967), German composer
Klaus Barbie (1913–1991), German SS-Hauptsturmführer and Holocaust Perpetrator
Klaus Bargsten (1911–2000), German captain and sole survivor of the sunken U-boat U-521 in World War II
Klaus Berntsen (1844–1927), Danish politician
Klaus Dede (1935–2018), German writer
Klaus Doldinger (born 1936), German musician
Klaus Fischer (born 1949), German footballer
Klaus Flouride (born 1949), bassist of the Dead Kennedys
Klaus Fuchs (1911–1988), German theoretical physicist and atomic spy
Klaus Gerhart (born 1965), outdoorsman and photographer
Klaus Iohannis (born 1959), Romanian politician
Klaus Isekenmeier (born 1975), German decathlete
Klaus Kinkel (1936–2019), German politician 
Klaus Kinski (1926–1991), German actor
Klaus Lage (born 1950), German musician 
Klaus Lanzarini (born 1977), Italian freestyle swimmer
Klaus Löwitsch (1936–2002), German actor 
Klaus Meine (born 1948), lead singer of German hard rock band Scorpions
Klaus Mertens (born 1949), German singer
Klaus Nomi (1944–1983), German entertainer
Klaus Ofczarek (1939–2020), Austrian opera singer and actor
Klaus Perwas (born 1971), German basketball coach and former player
Klaus Schilling (1871–1946), German experimenter in Nazi human concentration camp experiments executed for war crimes
Klaus Schulten, computational biophysicist
Klaus Schulze (1947-2022), German electronic music composer and musician
Klaus Tennstedt (1926–1998), German conductor
Klaus Voormann (born 1938), artist, musician, and record producer who was associated with the early days of The Beatles
Klaus Schwab (born 1938), German professor who founded the World Economic Forum
Klaus Wowereit (born 1953), German politician

Nickname
Klaus Maria Brandauer (born 1943), theatrical name of Klaus Georg Steng, Austrian actor

Characters
Klaus from Beyblade: Metal Masters
Klaus, aka the Architect, from Xenoblade Chronicles and Xenoblade Chronicles 2
Klaus, aka the Masked Man, from Mother 3
Klaus Baudelaire from A Series of Unfortunate Events
Klaus Daimler from The Life Aquatic with Steve Zissou
Klaus Hargreeves from The Umbrella Academy
Klaus Heisler from American Dad!
Klaus Mikaelson from The Vampire Diaries and The Originals
Baron Klaus Wulfenbach from Girl Genius
Klaus from Klaus
Klaus from Animal Crossing: New Horizons

See also
Claus, a variant of name
Klaukkala, Finnish village, whose name is partly based on the name Klaus

References

German masculine given names
Dutch masculine given names
Norwegian masculine given names
Swedish masculine given names
Danish masculine given names
Finnish masculine given names
Icelandic masculine given names
Surnames from given names